Robert Riley (born October 17, 1964) is a former American football wide receiver who played in one game. He played for the New York Jets. He played in one game before being suspended for steroid use. He did not play afterwards.

References

Living people
1964 births
New York Jets players
American football wide receivers
Oklahoma State Cowboys football players
National Football League replacement players
People from Nowata, Oklahoma